Kersten Meier (23 February 1954 in Celle – 3 April 2001) was a German swimmer who competed in the 1972 Summer Olympics. He died in 2001 in Düsseldorf.  The cause of death was suicide.

References

1954 births
2001 suicides
People from Celle
German male swimmers
German male freestyle swimmers
Olympic swimmers of West Germany
Swimmers at the 1972 Summer Olympics
World Aquatics Championships medalists in swimming
European Aquatics Championships medalists in swimming
Suicides by jumping in Germany
Sportspeople from Lower Saxony
20th-century German people
21st-century German people